Israel Pickens (January 30, 1780 – April 24, 1827) was an American politician and lawyer, third Governor of the U.S. state of Alabama (1821–1825), member of the North Carolina Senate (1808–1810), and United States Congressman from North Carolina in the United States House of Representatives (1811–1817).

Biography
Born in Concord, North Carolina, Pickens graduated from Jefferson College (now Washington & Jefferson College) in 1802, studied law, and was admitted to the bar. Pickens was a native of North Carolina and represented the "North Carolina Faction" in early Alabama politics, like fellow North Carolina Representative William R. King, with whom he served Congress during the early 1810s. The main opposition to the "North Carolina Faction" was the "Georgia Faction", which many new settlers to the state viewed as too aristocratic and elitist. At the same time, Pickens was seen as the "spokesman for the have-nots." Pickens married Martha Lenoir in 1814, the daughter of North Carolina statesman William Lenoir (general). In both 1821 and 1823, Pickens beat Dr. Henry Chambers by a vote of 9,114 to 7,129 and 6,942 to 4,604, respectively.

After serving as governor and being succeeded by his handpicked man John Murphy, Pickens was appointed to the United States Senate to fill the vacancy left by the death of Henry H. Chambers, whom he beat twice for the governorship. He only served from February 17 to November 27, 1826, when the elected successor, John McKinley, took office.

In addition to politics, Pickens participated in the American Colonization Society and was interested in scientific research. He invented a lunar dial.

Pickens died in Matanzas, Cuba in 1827. He was originally buried in a family graveyard, but his remains were later moved to City Cemetery, Greensboro, Alabama.

References

 

1780 births
1827 deaths
People from Concord, North Carolina
American people of Scotch-Irish descent
Democratic-Republican Party members of the United States House of Representatives from North Carolina
Jacksonian United States senators from Alabama
Alabama Democratic-Republicans
Alabama Jacksonians
Governors of Alabama
Democratic-Republican Party state governors of the United States
North Carolina state senators
Washington & Jefferson College alumni